This list of pathological dinosaur specimens enumerates those fossil dinosaur specimens that preserve evidence of injury, disease, deformity or parasitic infection.

Ankylosauria

Ceratopsians

Sauropodomorphs

Stegosaurs

Theropods

Footnotes

References
 McWhinney, L., Carpenter, K., and Rothschild, B., 2001, Dinosaurian humeral  periostitis: a case of a juxtacortical lesion in the fossil record: In: Mesozoic  Vertebrate Life, edited by Tanke, D. H., and Carpenter, K., Indiana University  Press, pp. 364–377
 Molnar, R. E., 2001,  Theropod paleopathology: a literature survey, In: Mesozoic  Vertebrate Life, edited by Tanke, D. H., and Carpenter, K., Indiana University  Press, p. 337-363.
 
 Rothschild, B., Tanke, D. H., and Ford, T. L., 2001,  Theropod stress fractures  and tendon avulsions as a clue to activity, In: Mesozoic Vertebrate Life, edited by Tanke, D. H., and Carpenter, K., Indiana University Press, p. 331-336.
 

Lists of dinosaur specimens
Specimens
Mesozoic fossil record